Locati is a surname. Notable people with the surname include:

Dany Locati (born 1977), Italian skeleton racer
Luigi Locati (1928–2005), Italian Catholic missionary and bishop
Sebastiano Giuseppe Locati (1861–1939), Italian architect
Umberto Locati (1503–1587), Italian Roman Catholic prelate and Bishop